Kinney Natatorium is a multi-purpose natatorium located in Lewisburg, Pennsylvania. The venue hosts home meets for the Bucknell Bison men's and women's swimming and diving teams and water polo teams. Kinney Natatorium was opened in 2002 and also host the PIAA swimming and diving championships annually.

References

College swimming venues in the United States
Bucknell Bison
Indoor arenas in Pennsylvania
Buildings and structures in Union County, Pennsylvania
2002 establishments in Pennsylvania